The Conger Range, also called the Conger Mountains, is a mountain range in Quttinirpaaq National Park on Ellesmere Island, Nunavut, Canada, beginning about  west of Mount Osborne. It is part of the Arctic Cordillera which is a vast dissected mountain system extending from Ellesmere Island to the northernmost tip of Labrador and northeastern Quebec. The Conger Range is a structural extension of the Garfield Range and continues into the highlands north of the head of Hare Fiord. Most of its peaks are ice-covered, although nearly all of the southern slopes are ice-free. Many of the valleys between the peaks are filled with glacial tongues spilling out to the south from the Grand Land Ice Cap.

The Conger Range was named by American Polar explorer Adolphus Greely, who sighted them during a dog sledding exploration to the interior of northern Ellesmere Island in 1882.

References

Arctic Cordillera
Mountain ranges of Qikiqtaaluk Region